HMMS may refer to:

 Hartford Magnet Middle School, a former name of Hartford Magnet Trinity College Academy in Hartford, Connecticut
 Hidden Markov Model, a type of statistical model
 Hope Mills Middle School in Hope Mills, North Carolina